Beau Brummel is a 1913 silent short film directed by and starring James Young in the title role. Presumed now to be lost, it was produced in Brooklyn, New York, by Vitagraph Studios and also featured in its cast Clara Kimball Young, Rex Ingram, Julia Swayne Gordon, and Etienne Girardot. The photoplay's scenario was adapted from the Clyde Fitch novel and play, and upon the film's release Vitagraph listed it as a 1000-foot "one-reeler", which at the time would have had a maximum running time of 15 minutes.

On stage, in 1890, Richard Mansfield originally starred in Beau Brummell on Broadway.  Other film adaptations were produced in both the silent and sound eras, including the 1924 remake starring John Barrymore and Mary Astor and the 1954 version with Stewart Granger, Elizabeth Taylor and Peter Ustinov.

Cast
James Young - Beau Brummell
Clara Kimball Young - Helen Ballarat
Charles Chapman - The Prince of Wales (the later George IV)
Julia Swayne Gordon - The Duchess
Edward R. Phillips - Lord Ballarat (*as E. R. Phillips)
James Morrison - Lord Alvanley
Etienne Girardot - Isadore, Brummel's Valet
Rex Ingram - (*billed as Rex Hitchcock)
Richard Leslie - Lord Beaconsfield (*as Dick Leslie)
Helene Costello - Child

Notes

References

External links
 Beau Brummel in the Internet Movie Database

1913 films
American silent short films
American black-and-white films
Films set in the 1800s
Films set in the 1810s
American films based on plays
Films directed by James Young
Cultural depictions of Beau Brummell
Cultural depictions of George IV
1910s American films